Honghe Hani and Yi Autonomous Prefecture (Yi: ꉼꉸꉳꆃꁈꆃꁈꊨꏦꍓ) is an autonomous prefecture in Southeast-Central Yunnan Province, China, bordering Vietnam's Lào Cai and Lai Châu provinces to the south. Its name is derived from the Hong (Red) River and the two major ethnic minority groups who live there: the Yi and the Hani. The total population is 4.8 million, of which 61.3% belong to ethnic minorities.

In 2008, the State Administration of Cultural Heritage of the People's Republic of China nominated the Honghe Hani Terraced Fields of Yuanyang County for World Heritage Site status. It was added to the list on 22 June 2013, bringing the total number of World Heritage Sites in China to 45.

Subdivisions 
The prefecture is subdivided into 13 county-level divisions: 4 county-level cities, 6 counties, and 3 autonomous counties:

Demographics
At the end of 2019, Honghe Prefecture had 4.775 million residents, of which 61.3% belong to ethnic minorities.

Ethnic groups in Honghe, 2000 census

Ethnic subgroups

Honghe Prefecture has the following ethnic Hani subgroups (Honghe Ethnic Gazetteer 1989:32):

Hani
Nuobi
Nuomei
Ache
Lami
Baihong
Asuo
Budu
Qide
Gehe
Biyue
Kaduo
Ha'ou
Enu (Ximoluo)

Honghe Prefecture has the following 10 ethnic Yi subgroups (Honghe Ethnic Gazetteer 1989:68):

Nisubo  (exonyms and other names: Luoluo , Sandaohong , Huayao , Muji )
Nibo  (exonyms and other names: Sani , Azhe )
Gepo  (exonyms and other names: White Yi )
Siqi  (exonyms and other names: Large Black Yi , Small Black Yi )
Axibo  (exonyms and other names: Axi )
Puwabo , Pulebo  (exonyms and other names: Pula )
Alubo  (exonyms and other names: Alu )
Lesubo  (exonyms and other names: Shansu )
Luobo  (exonyms and other names: Awu , Laowu )
Xiangtang

Transportation

Roads 

 G80 Guangzhou–Kunming Expressway
 G8011 Kaiyuan–Hekou Expressway
 G5615 Tianbao–Houqiao Expressway
 S45 Yuanjiang–Manhao Expressway
 China National Highway 219
 China National Highway 323
 China National Highway 326
 China National Highway 553

Railways 
The prefecture is crossed by the early-20th century narrow-gauge Kunming–Hai Phong Railway and its branches. These railways have lost their most of their economic importance after the opening of the standard-gauge Kunming-Hekou railway (whose sections within the prefecture are the Yuxi–Mengzi Railway and the Mengzi–Hekou Railway).

The prefecture is also served by the Nanning–Kunming high-speed railway and Mile–Mengzi Railway (under construction).

Airport 
Honghe Mengzi Airport is being built in the prefectural capital Mengzi.

References

External links

 Honghe Prefecture official website
 Hani fields

 
Hani autonomous counties
Yi autonomous prefectures